Agathiphaga is a genus of moths, known as kauri moths. It is the only living in the family Agathiphagidae. This caddisfly-like lineage of primitive moths was first reported by Lionel Jack Dumbleton in 1952, as a new genus of Micropterigidae.

The caterpillars feed only on "kauri" (Agathis) and are currently considered the second most primitive living lineage of moths after Micropterigoidea. The larvae have been reported to be able to survive for 12 years in diapause, durability possibly a prerequisite to its possible dispersion around the Pacific islands in the seeds of Agathis.

Dumbleton described two species. Agathiphaga queenslandensis is found along the north-eastern coast of Queensland, Australia, and its larvae feed on Agathis robusta. Agathiphaga vitiensis is found from  Fiji to Vanuatu and the Solomon Islands, and its larvae feed on Agathis vitiensis.

A fossil member of Agathiphagidae, Agathiphagama, is known from the Burmese amber of Myanmar, dating to the early Cenomanian stage of the Late Cretaceous, approximately 99 million years ago.

References

External links 

 
 
 
 Agathiphagidae Tree of Life Web Project
 

Moth genera
 
Taxa named by Lionel Jack Dumbleton